Japan competed at the 1980 Winter Paralympics in Geilo, Norway. In total five competitors from Japan won zero medals and the country finished 11th in the medal table.

All five competitors competed in alpine skiing.

Alpine skiing 

The following athletes represented Japan at the Men's Giant Slalom 1A and Men's Slalom 1A events:

 Sadami Fukasawa
 Tsuyoshi Ishii
 Shinobu Sakurai

Kotsuo Togase represented Japan at the Men's Giant Slalom 2A and Men's Slalom 2A events.

Hiroshi Yanagisawa represented Japan at the Men's Giant Slalom 3B and Men's Slalom 3B events.

See also 

 Japan at the Paralympics
 Japan at the 1980 Winter Olympics

References 

Japan at the Paralympics
1980 in Japanese sport
Nations at the 1980 Winter Paralympics